MV Northumberland was a refrigerated cargo liner built in 1955 and scrapped in 1978.

She was built in 1955 for the New Zealand Shipping Company by John Brown & Co. in Clydebank, Scotland. It was later sold to P&O; then later to a Panamanian company under the name of Kavo Astrapi; and finally to Guan Guan Shipping  in Singapore as Golden City. It was scrapped in 1978 in Hong Kong.

References

1955 ships
Ships built on the River Clyde